The Danish Women's Handball Cup, known as the Santander Cup for sponsorship reasons, is the main domestic cup tournament for Danish women's handball clubs, which is partially organised and supervised by the Danish Handball Federation. The competition has been played annually since 1964.

Tournament structure
The initial 6 rounds are managed by the three regional federations with the DHF taking over the tournament at the round of 16. It ultimately results in a final four event scheduled between Christmas and New Year. The winner of the tournament qualify for the annual Super Cup held during the summer where they meet the season's league winner. If the same team wins both the league and the cup, the losing cup finalist will participate as the second team in the Super Cup.

Past winners

Finals
The following table contains all the finals from the over fifty years long history of the Danish Women's Handball Cup.

Most valuable players
Since 1993, DHF has named an MVP following the cup final.

Performances
Clubs listed in bold are currently playing in the 2019-20 season of the Danish Women's Handball League.

 Notes

References

External links
 The Danish Handball Federation 
 About the tournament 

Handball competitions in Denmark
Recurring sporting events established in 1964
Annual sporting events in Denmark
1964 establishments in Denmark